Maksim Mikhalin (born 3 September 1997) is a Russian handball player for SKIF Krasnodar and the Russian national team.

He represented Russia at the 2019 World Men's Handball Championship.

References

 

1997 births
Living people
Russian male handball players
Sportspeople from Krasnodar